Gun Glory is a 1957 American Metrocolor Western film directed by Roy Rowland starring Stewart Granger and Rhonda Fleming.

Plot
Tom Early rides into a Wyoming town where he once lived with his wife and son. In the general store, owner Wainscott is annoyed when he believes clerk Jo is flirtatious with Early.

At his old ranch, Early finds his wife's grave and his 17-year-old son, Tom Jr. (miscast by 24 year old Steve Rowland, son of the film's director Roy Rowland), an immature, childish young man embittered by his father's having abandoned them.

Jo takes a job as housekeeper at Early's ranch. She resists the advances of Tom Jr., whose resentment of his father grows. When they attend church, Wainscott turns the preacher's congregation against them, insinuating Jo is living there in sin.

Townspeople need help, though, when gunmen working for the villainous cattleman Grimsell ambush one of their own. A posse is formed, but by the time Early gets there, the preacher is dying and Tom Jr. is wounded.

Tom uses Dynamite to start a rockslide, stampeding Grimsell's cattle and killing some of his men. In a showdown, Early fights with Gunn, one of Grimsell's men, and just in the nick of time, Tom Jr. comes to his rescue. They return home to a relieved Jo.

Cast
 Stewart Granger as Tom Early
 Rhonda Fleming as Jo
 Chill Wills as Preacher
 Steve Rowland as Tom Early, Jr.
 James Gregory as Grimsell
 Jacques Aubuchon as Sam Wainscott
 Arch Johnson as Gunn
 Rayford Barnes as Blonde

Production
The film was based on an original story by Cyril Hume according to one account.  Another says it was based on the novel Man of the West by Philip Yordan which Ben Maddow says he wrote under Yordan's name. Maddow also claims to have written the script. Yordan said "But if you read the screenplay, you'll see it fits the hero character that I've always written. I've always written the one character. The hero. A man with a cold, hard, bad past—and I never like to go into the past—with his own set of morals and everything else."

It was one of a series of Westerns MGM started making following the success of The Fastest Gun Alive.

Robert Horton was originally announced as star. Then Stewart Granger was assigned to star. The film was made towards the end of Granger's contract with MGM and he felt they assigned him to this low-budget film to punish him for not renewing with the studio.

He appeared opposite Steve Rowland, the son of the director.

Burl Ives was to play the preacher but had to withdraw and was replaced by Chill Wills. However the music recorded by Ives for the film was retained in the finished production.

Location
The film was shot on locations in Humboldt County, California.

Reception
According to MGM records, the film earned $1,125,000 in the US and Canada and $1,425,000 overseas, making a loss of $265,000.

In France, it recorded admissions of 889,516.

Comic book adaptation
 Dell Four Color #846 (October 1957)

See also
 List of American films of 1957

References

External links
 
 
Review of film at Variety

1957 films
Metro-Goldwyn-Mayer films
CinemaScope films
Films with screenplays by William Ludwig
Films directed by Roy Rowland
Films adapted into comics
Revisionist Western (genre) films
1950s English-language films
American Western (genre) films
1950s American films